Carcinopyga gurkoi is a moth of the family Erebidae. It was described by Peter Kautt and Aidas Saldaitis in 1997. It is found in the Pamir Mountains of Tajikistan.

References

Callimorphina
Moths described in 1997